Charles or Charlie Scott may refer to:

Politicians
 Charles Scott (governor) (1739–1813), American Revolutionary War soldier and fourth governor of Kentucky
 Charles L. Scott (1827–1899), U.S. Representative from California
 Charles Frederick Scott (1860–1938), U.S. Representative from Kansas
 Charles Scott (Wyoming politician) (born 1945), Republican member of the Wyoming Senate

Sportspeople
 Charles Scott (lacrosse) (1883–1954), British lacrosse player
 Charles Scott (footballer) (1885–1916), Scottish footballer
 Charlie Scott (basketball) (born 1948), basketball player
 Charles Scott (American football) (born 1986), running back
 Charlie Scott (footballer) (born 1997), English footballer
 Charlie Scott (cricketer) (born 1999), English cricketer

Other people
 Charles Rochfort Scott (c. 1790–1872), British general
 Charles Scott (ambassador) (1838–1924), British ambassador to Russia
 C. P. Scott (Charles Prestwich Scott, 1846–1932), British journalist, publisher and politician
 Charles F. Scott (engineer) (1864–1944), American electrical engineer
 Charles Kennedy Scott (1876–1965), English organist and choral conductor
 Charles Lewis Scott (1883–1954), United States Army officer, commander of U.S. 2nd Armored Division
 Charles Hepburn Scott (1886–1964), Scottish-born Canadian artist
 Charles Scott (bishop) (1898–1927), Anglican missionary bishop
 C. W. A. Scott (Charles William Anderson Scott, 1903–1946), pioneer aviator
 Charles R. Scott (1905–1983), U.S. federal judge
 Charles E. Scott (born 1935), American philosopher